William Henry Hatfield (born 10 October 1991) is an English semi-professional footballer who plays as a midfielder for  club AFC Fylde. He began his career with Leeds United, but never made an appearance for their first team. He went on to play in the Football League for Accrington Stanley as well as in non-league football for York City, FC Halifax Town, Guiseley and Darlington.

Early life
Hatfield was born in Liversedge, West Yorkshire, and attended Woodhouse Grove School in Apperley Bridge.

Career
Hatfield came through the Leeds United youth system, having joined the club as an eight-year-old. His first matchday involvement in the first team came on 3 February 2010 as an unused substitute in a 3–1 home defeat to Tottenham Hotspur in an FA Cup fourth-round replay. Hatfield joined Conference Premier club York City on 28 January 2011 on a one-month loan, playing four matches.

He joined League Two club Accrington Stanley on 14 October 2011 on a one-month loan. He made his debut the following day as a half-time substitute in a 2–0 home defeat to Swindon Town in League Two. Having made four appearances, his loan was extended until the end of December 2011. After his loan spell at Accrington ended, Hatfield and his Leeds teammate Sanchez Payne joined Conference Premier club Lincoln City on trial.

Hatfield left Leeds on 12 January 2012 after agreeing to mutually terminate his contract. He signed for FC Halifax Town later that month, making his debut on 24 January 2012 as a 66th-minute substitute in a 2–2 home draw with Gainsborough Trinity in the Conference North.

On 10 February 2012, Hatfield re-signed for League Two club Accrington Stanley on a contract until the end of 2011–12 season. He signed a new one-year contract with the club in June 2012. He scored four goals in an FA Cup tie against AFC Fylde on 3 November 2012.

Hatfield re-joined Conference Premier club FC Halifax Town on 27 November 2014 on a 28-day loan, and signed for the club permanently on 15 January 2015 after leaving Accrington by mutual consent. Hatfield signed for newly promoted National League club Guiseley on 19 June 2015, and went on to spend four seasons with the club. He left Guiseley in July 2019 and signed for National League North club Darlington.

Hatfield was named as Darlington's Away Player of the Year, Players' Player of the Year and Player of the Year for the 2019–20 season, as well as winning their Goal of the Season award for his strike against Kidderminster Harriers.

On 22 March 2022, Hatfield signed for fellow National League North club AFC Fylde for an undisclosed fee.

Career statistics

References

External links

Will Hatfield profile at the Guiseley A.F.C. website

1991 births
Living people
People from Liversedge
Footballers from West Yorkshire
English footballers
Association football midfielders
Leeds United F.C. players
York City F.C. players
Accrington Stanley F.C. players
FC Halifax Town players
Guiseley A.F.C. players
Darlington F.C. players
AFC Fylde players
National League (English football) players
English Football League players